The Greek smooth newt or Greek newt (Lissotriton graecus) is a newt species found in the southern Balkans, from southern Croatia (Dalmatia) over Montenegro, Albania and North Macedonia to Greece and south-westernmost Bulgaria.

Willy Wolterstorff described the species in 1906 as Triton vulgaris graeca, a subspecies of the smooth newt. After genetic data had suggested the smooth newt was a complex of distinct lineages, Dubois and Raffaëlli, in 2009, recognised several subspecies, including the Greek smooth newt, as distinct species. This was followed by subsequent authors. Molecular phylogenetics suggested that the closest relative of the Greek smooth newt is Kosswig's smooth newt (Lissotriton kosswigi) from northwestern Anatolia.

The species differs from other species in the smooth newt species complex mainly in the male secondary characters during breeding season. The male dorsal crest is less than 1 mm high and has smooth edges. The belly has many small spots, but the lower tail fin is usually unspotted. The well-developed dorso-lateral folds give the body a square shape. Toe flaps on the hind feet are well developed.

The species's conservation status has not yet been evaluated separately from the smooth newt by the IUCN. Since its range is much smaller than that of the smooth newt species complex as a whole, it is likely to be more vulnerable than previously estimated. It has been negatively impacted by the introduction of fish.

References

Lissotriton
Amphibians of Europe
Amphibians described in 1906